Nube(s) can refer to the following:
National Union of Bank Employees
Nephele (Nube in Latin), a nymph in Greek mythology
Nūbē, a character in Hell Teacher Nūbē
a variation of newbie
The Clouds (or Nubes in Latin), an ancient Greek comedy by Aristophanes
 "Nubes (song)", a 2021 song by Rauw Alejandro